Procambarus texanus (the "Bastrop crayfish") is a species of crayfish in the family Cambaridae. It is only known from a fish hatchery near Smithville, Bastrop County, Texas. and is listed as Data Deficient on the IUCN Red List.

References

Cambaridae
Freshwater crustaceans of North America
Endemic fauna of Texas
Taxonomy articles created by Polbot
Crustaceans described in 1971
Taxa named by Horton H. Hobbs Jr.